Jocelyn Lee (born Mary Alice Simpson; June 21, 1902 – June 15, 1980) was an American actress. She was also known as Jocelyn Leigh.

Biography
Jocelyn Lee was born on June 21, 1902, in Chicago, Illinois as Mary Alice Simpson. She died on June 15, 1980, in New York City. She performed in the Ziegfeld Follies.

Personal life
On April 27, 1922, Lee married film producer Henry Lehrman in Los Angeles. They were divorced on December 16, 1924. She later married director and writer Luther Reed; they were divorced on April 3, 1931. In January 1935, Lee married associate producer James Seymour.

Partial filmography

 The Dressmaker from Paris (1925)
 Paris at Midnight (1926) 
 Sunny Side Up (1926) 
 The Campus Flirt (1926) 
 Everybody's Acting (1926) 
 A Kiss in a Taxi (1927) 
 Afraid to Love (1927) 
 The Love Thrill (1927) 
 Say It with Diamonds (1927)
 Ten Modern Commandments (1927)
 Shanghai Bound (1927)
 Backstage (1927)
 The Masked Angel (1928) 
 The Night Bird (1928) 
 Dry Martini (1928)
 Broadway Babies (1929) 
 Twin Beds (1929)
 The Love Trap (1929) 
 Three Live Ghosts (1929) 
 Young Nowheres (1929) 
 The Marriage Playground (1929) 
 No, No, Nanette (1930)  
 Her First Mate (1933).

References

External links

 

1902 births
1980 deaths
20th-century American actresses
American film actresses
American silent film actresses
Actresses from Chicago